Appin is a coastal district of the Scottish Highlands.

Appin may also refer to:

Appin, New South Wales, Australia
Appin, Ontario, Canada
Appin (Bennettsville, South Carolina), listed on the U.S. National Register of Historic Places in South Carolina